Leptobrachella platycephala is a species of frogs in the family Megophryidae. It is endemic to Peninsular Malaysia and only known from its type locality, Mount Benum in Pahang.

References

platycephala
Amphibians of Malaysia
Endemic fauna of Malaysia
Amphibians described in 2012